Nothosmyrnium is a genus of flowering plants belonging to the family Apiaceae.

Its native range is China to Japan.

Species
Species:

Nothosmyrnium japonicum 
Nothosmyrnium xizangense

References

Apioideae
Apioideae genera